The blacksmith thrush or eastern slaty thrush (Turdus subalaris) is a passerine bird belonging to the genus Turdus in the thrush family, Turdidae. It is native to eastern South America. It was formerly considered conspecific with the Andean slaty thrush, with the combined species known as slaty thrush.

It is 21 centimetres long. The male has dark greyish upperparts, a grey breast and a white belly. The head is black apart from the throat, which is white with dark streaks. The bill is mostly yellow. The female is mostly dull brown with few markings, unlike the female of the Andean slaty thrush, which has a browner version of the male's pattern. The song is high-pitched and has an unusual metallic, scraping quality.

It inhabits forest, woodland and parks. Its breeding range covers north-east Argentina, eastern Paraguay and southern Brazil, with some isolated records in Uruguay. Some birds migrate north in winter as far as central Brazil.

References

De la Peña, Martín & Rumboll, Maurice (1998) Collins Illustrated Checklist: Birds of Southern South America and Antarctica, HarperCollins, London.
Souza, Deodato (2002) All the Birds of Brazil: An Identification Guide, Dall.

External links
Recordings of song and call on Xeno-canto

blacksmith thrush
Birds of the South Region
Birds of the Selva Misionera
blacksmith thrush
blacksmith thrush